Gayla Industries, Inc. was founded in 1961 primarily as a manufacturer of plastic keel-guided delta-wing kites that require no tails, as well as latex balloons. Their kites are sold worldwide in toy and hobby stores. The company owns several patents on their tail-less keel-guided kite designs.

Products 
The company's product line, while remaining primarily plastic kites, has expanded to include rip-stop nylon kites, balloon-based exercise products, flying toys, and wind socks.

References

External links 
 Company website

Companies based in Houston